Baby That's Backatcha is a 1975 single written, produced and performed by Smokey Robinson.  From the album, A Quiet Storm, this disco/dance record (also featured on the disco charts) was Robinson's first of two solo (without the Miracles) number ones on the R&B chart and his second Top 40 solo hit peaking at number 26.

See also
List of number-one R&B singles of 1975 (U.S.)

References

1975 songs
1975 singles
Smokey Robinson songs
Songs written by Smokey Robinson
Song recordings produced by Smokey Robinson